Submarine Seahawk is a 1958 World War II film directed by Spencer Gordon Bennet and starring John Bentley and Brett Halsey. The film was originally released as a double feature with Paratroop Command. The plot tells the story of a by-the-book officer (in his first command in the Pacific war) who is ordered to take his submarine on a reconnaissance mission to locate a fleet of Japanese fighting ships the Allies have lost track of. At first, the rest of the crew resent his distant manner and the way he keeps avoiding taking on the Japanese.

Plot

Cast
 John Bentley as Lt. Cmdr. Paul Turner
 Brett Halsey as Lt. (j.g.) David Shore
 Wayne Heffley as Cmdr. Dean Stoker
 Steve Mitchell as CPO Andy Flowers
 Henry McCann as Seaman Ellis Bellis
 Paul Maxwell as Lt. Cmdr. Bill Hallohan, XO
 Nicky Blair as Sam
 Frank Gerstle as Capt. Boardman
 Jan Brooks as Mrs. Ellen Turner
 Mabel Rea as Maisie
 Leon Tyler as Ed
 Hal Bogart as Radio Operator
 Frank Watkins as Bearded Sonar Man
 Don Fenwick as Radio Operator
 Marilyn Hanold as Nancy

Production
Submarine Seahawk was the last film produced by Alex Gordon for AIP. Gordon was unhappy that he was never given money owed for his films - a complaint echoed by others who worked for AIP including Jack Rabin, Edward Bernds, Herman Cohen, Sid Pink and Bert I. Gordon. Gordon also recalled his permission to use footage to from the 1943 Warner Bros. films Destination Tokyo and Air Force through his brother Richard Gordon.

References

External links
 
 
 

1958 films
American International Pictures films
Pacific War films
Films about the United States Navy in World War II
World War II submarine films
1950s English-language films
Films directed by Spencer Gordon Bennet